Joseph Francis Bataillon (born October 3, 1949) is a senior United States district judge of the United States District Court for the District of Nebraska.

Education and career

Born in Omaha, Nebraska, Bataillon received a Bachelor of Arts degree from Creighton University in 1971 and a Juris Doctor from Creighton University School of Law in 1974. Bataillon was a deputy public defender, Douglas County, Nebraska from 1974 to 1980. He was in private practice in Omaha from 1980 to 1997.

Federal judicial service

On January 7, 1997, Bataillon was nominated by President Bill Clinton to a seat on the United States District Court for the District of Nebraska vacated by Lyle E. Strom. Bataillon was confirmed by the United States Senate on September 11, 1997, and received his commission on September 18, 1997. He served as chief judge of the District from 2004 to 2011. He assumed senior status on October 3, 2014.

Notable case

In 2003-05, Bataillon heard Citizens for Equal Protection v. Bruning, a federal constitutional challenge to Nebraska Initiative Measure 416, a voter initiative constitutional amendment that prohibited Nebraska from recognizing same-sex marriages or unions. In November, 2005, Bataillon ruled that Initiative Measure 416 was unconstitutional under the Equal Protection Clause, the First Amendment, and the Contract Clause's prohibition on bills of attainder. Bataillon became the first judge in the U.S. to invalidate a state marriage amendment defining marriage as between a man and a woman on federal constitutional grounds. In July, 2006, the United States Court of Appeals for the Eighth Circuit reversed his decision on all three arguments and held that "laws limiting the state-recognized institution of marriage to heterosexual couples ... do not violate the Constitution of the United States." In 2015, the Eighth Circuit's ruling was invalidated by the United States Supreme Court's decision in Obergefell v. Hodges.

References

Sources

1949 births
Living people
Creighton University alumni
Judges of the United States District Court for the District of Nebraska
Lawyers from Omaha, Nebraska
United States district court judges appointed by Bill Clinton
Creighton University School of Law alumni
20th-century American judges
21st-century American judges
Public defenders